Steinberg Media Technologies GmbH (trading as Steinberg) is a German musical software and hardware company based in Hamburg. It develops music writing, recording, arranging, and editing software, most notably Cubase, Nuendo, and Dorico. It also designs audio and MIDI hardware interfaces, controllers, and iOS/Android music apps including Cubasis. Steinberg created several industry standard music technologies including the Virtual Studio Technology (VST) format for plug-ins and the ASIO (Audio Stream Input/Output) protocol. Steinberg has been a wholly owned subsidiary of Yamaha since 2005.

History 
The company was founded in 1984 by Karl Steinberg and Manfred Rürup in Hamburg. As early proponents and fans of the MIDI protocol, the two developed Pro 16, a MIDI sequencing application for the Commodore 64 and soon afterwards, Pro 24 for the Atari ST platform. The ST had built-in MIDI ports which helped to quickly increase interest in the new technology across the music world.

In 1989 Steinberg released Cubase for Atari, and versions for the Mac and Windows platforms would follow soon afterwards. It became a very popular MIDI sequencer, used in studios around the globe.

Steinberg Media Technologies AG had a revenue of 25 million DM in 1999. It had 180 employees in 2000.  A planned entry on the  Neuer Markt (New Market, NEMAX50) of the Deutsche Börse failed. The company had a revenue of 20 million in 2001 and 130 employees in 2002.

In 2003 Steinberg was acquired by Pinnacle Systems and shortly after that, by Yamaha in 2004. With its new mother company Yamaha, Steinberg expanded design and production of its own hardware, and since 2008 it has created a range of audio and MIDI interface hardware including the UR, MR816, CC and CI series.

In 2012, Steinberg launched its first iOS sequencer, Cubasis, which has seen regular updates since then. The Steinberg satellite office in London was also opened in 2012.

Steinberg has won a number of industry awards including several MIPA awards, and accolades for Cubasis and its CMC controllers amongst others.

Dorico team acquisition 

In 2012, Steinberg acquired the former development team behind Sibelius, following the closure of Avid's London office in July, to begin development on a new professional scoring software named Dorico. It was released on 19 October 2016.

Product History 
Cubase was released in 1989, initially as a MIDI sequencer. Digital audio recording followed in 1992 with Cubase Audio, followed by VST support in 1996 which made it possible for third-party software programmers to create and sell virtual instruments for Cubase. Steinberg bundled its own VST instruments and effects with Cubase, as well as continuing to develop standalone instruments as well. Atari support eventually ended and Cubase became a Mac and Windows DAW (digital audio workstation), with feature parity across both platforms.

The WaveLab audio editing and mastering suite followed in 1995 for Windows, and the VST and ASIO protocols – open technologies that could be used by any manufacturer – were first released in 1997. WaveLab would come to the Mac in 2010.

In 2000 the company released Nuendo, a new DAW clearly targeted at the broadcast and media industries. 2001 saw the release of HALion, a dedicated software sampler. A complete rewrite of Cubase in 2002 was necessary due to its legacy code which was no longer maintainable, leading to a name change to Cubase SX, ditching older technology and using the audio engine from Nuendo. Since this time, Cubase and Nuendo have shared many core technologies. Cubase currently comes in three versions – Elements, Artist and Pro.

Steinberg was one of the first DAW manufacturers who started using automatic delay compensation for synchronization of different channels of the mixer which may have different latency.

With the growing popularity of mobile devices, Steinberg develops apps for iOS including Cubasis, a fully featured DAW for iPad with plug-ins, full audio and MIDI recording and editing and many other professional features. It also creates standalone apps including the Nanologue synth and LoopMash. In 2016 Steinberg released Dorico, a professional music notation and scoring suite.

Steinberg VST 
As part of the development of its flagship, the sequencer Cubase, Steinberg defined the VST interface (Virtual Studio Technology) in 1996, by means of which external programs can be integrated as virtual instruments playable via MIDI. VST simulates a real-time studio environment with EQs, effects, mixing and automation and has become a quasi-standard supported by many other audio editing programs.

The latest version is VST 3. The VST 3 is a general rework of the long-serving VST plug-in interface. It is not compatible with the older VST versions, but it includes some new features and possibilities.

Initially developed for Macintosh only, Steinberg Cubase VST for the PC followed a year later and established VST and the Audio Stream Input/Output Protocol (ASIO) as open standards that enabled third parties to develop plug-ins and audio hardware. ASIO ensures that the delay caused by the audio hardware during sound output is kept to a minimum to enable hardware manufacturers to provide specialized drivers. ASIO has established itself as the standard for audio drivers.

Products

Current products

Music software
Cubase
Dorico
Nuendo
WaveLab
SpectraLayers
Sequel
Cubasis (for iOS and Android)

VST instruments
HALion (SE/Sonic) - virtual sampling and sound design system
HALion Symphonic Orchestra
Groove Agent - electronic and acoustic drums
The Grand - virtual Piano
Padshop - granular synthesizer
Retrologue - analog synthesizer
Dark Planet - dark sounds for cinematic and electronic music
Hypnotic Dance - synth-based dance sounds
Triebwerk - Sounds for Elektro, Techno and House
Iconica - Orchester Library, recorded at Funkhaus Berlin

Hardware
Steinberg AXR4 – 28x24 Thunderbolt 2 Audio Interface with 32-Bit Integer Recording and RND SILK
Steinberg UR824 – 24x24 USB 2.0 audio interface with 8x D-PREs, 24-bit/192 kHz, on board DSP, zero latency monitoring, advanced integration. Their top-of-the-line USB audio interface
Steinberg CC121 – Advanced Integration Controller
Steinberg CI2 – Advanced Integration Controller
Steinberg MR816 CSX – Advanced Integration DSP Studio
Steinberg MR816 X – Advanced Integration DSP Studio
Steinberg UR44 – 6x4 USB 2.0 audio interface with 4x D-PREs, 24-bit/192 kHz support & MIDI I/O
Steinberg UR22mkII – 2x2 USB 2.0 audio interface with 2x D-PREs, 24-bit/192 kHz support & MIDI I/O
Steinberg UR12 – 2x2 USB 2.0 audio interface with 1x D-PREs, 24-bit/192 kHz support
Steinberg Key (License Control Device for Steinberg Software - Dongle)
eLicenser (License Control Management for Steinberg Software - Dongle)

Past products

Music software
Pro 16 (for Commodore 64)
Trackstar (for Commodore 64)
Pro 24 (for Atari ST, Amiga)
The Ear (for Atari ST)
Twelve (for Atari ST)
Tango (for Atari ST)
MusiCal (for Atari ST)
Cubeat (for Atari ST)
Cubase Lite (for Atari ST/Mac/PC)
 SoundWorks series (for Atari ST) - Sample editors for the Akai S900, Ensoniq Mirage, E-mu Emax and Sequential Prophet 2000
 SynthWorks series (for Atari ST) - Patch editor/librarians for the Yamaha DX7, DX7II, TX7 and TX81z, Roland D50 and MT32 and Ensoniq ESQ-1
Cubase SX
Cubase VST
Avalon - sample editor for AtariV-Stack
ReCycle - Windows/Mac sample editor

VST instruments
Plex
D'cota
Hypersonic
X-phraze
Model-E
Virtual Guitarist
Virtual Bassist

Hardware
MIDEX-8 - USB MIDI interface
MIDEX-3 - USB MIDI interface
MIDEX+ - Atari MIDI interface
Steinberg Amiga MIDI interface 
Steinberg Media Interface 4 (MI4) - USB MIDI interface
Avalon 16 DA Converter - AD Converter for Atari
SMP-24 - SMPTE/MIDI processor
Timelock - SMPTE processor
Topaz - Computer controlled recorder

 Protocols 
Steinberg have introduced several industry-standard software protocols. These include:
ASIO (a low-latency communication protocol between software and sound cards)
VST (a protocol allowing third-party audio plugins and virtual instruments)
LTB (providing accurate timing for its now-discontinued MIDI interfaces)
VSL (an audio/MIDI network protocol which allows the connection and synchronisation of multiple computers running Steinberg software)

Steinberg's notable packages include the sequencers Cubase and Nuendo, as well as WaveLab'' (a digital audio editor) and numerous VST plugins.

References

Further reading

External links
 

German brands
Software companies of Germany
Music equipment manufacturers
Manufacturing companies based in Hamburg
Manufacturing companies established in 1984
Software companies established in 1984
1984 establishments in Germany
Yamaha Corporation
2005 mergers and acquisitions